Eurema messalina, the shy yellow, is a butterfly in the family Pieridae. It is native to the West Indies, but a very rare stray may be found in southern Florida. The habitat consists of shady, brushy areas.

Both sexes are creamy white. Males have black borders on the outer edges of both wings and females have a black apex. Males also have a pink bar on the underside of the forewing that fades after death. Adults are on wing from May to August and in February. Adults feed on flower nectar.

The larvae feed on Desmodium and Cassia species.

References

messalina
Butterflies of the Caribbean
Butterflies of Cuba
Butterflies of Jamaica
Butterflies of North America
Butterflies described in 1787